Statistics of Swedish football Division 3 for the 1946–47 season. At the end of this season major re-structuring of the Swedish third tier took place with the number of divisions reduced from 16 sections to 4 sections.  There were no promotions to Division 2 and most of the third tier teams were relegated to Division 4 for the 1947-48 season.

League standings

Uppsvenska Sydöstra 1946–47

The league table is not currently available but it is known that Ljusne AIK won the division and Strands IF qualified for the relegation playoffs.

Uppsvenska Östra 1946–47

Uppsvenska Västra 1946–47

Östsvenska 1946–47

Centralserien Norra 1946–47

NB: Riddarhytte SK withdrew.

Centralserien Södra 1946–47

Nordvästra Norra 1946–47

Nordvästra Södra 1946–47

Mellansvenska Norra 1946–47

Mellansvenska Södra 1946–47

Sydöstra Norra 1946–47

Sydöstra Södra 1946–47

Västsvenska Norra 1946–47

Västsvenska Södra 1946–47

Sydsvenska Norra 1946–47

Sydsvenska Södra 1946–47

Footnotes

References 

Swedish Football Division 3 seasons
3
Swed